Iván Ruttkay (3 February 1926 – 30 June 2013) was a Hungarian speed skater who competed in the 1948 Winter Olympics.

In 1948 he finished tenth in the 1500 metres event, 13th in the 5000 metres competition, 15th in the 10000 metres event, and 37th in the 500 metres competition.

External links
Speed skating 1948  
Iván Ruttkay's profile at Sports Reference.com

1926 births
2013 deaths
Hungarian male speed skaters
Olympic speed skaters of Hungary
Speed skaters at the 1948 Winter Olympics